Italy participated at the 2018 Summer Youth Olympics in Buenos Aires, Argentina from 6 October to 18 October 2018.

Archery

Italy qualified one archer based on its performance at the 2017 World Archery Youth Championships.

Individual

Team

Athletics

Italy qualified 13 athletes, based on 2018 European Athletics U18 Championships results.

400 m: Lorenzo Benati (Atl. Roma Acquacetosa)
3000 m: Francesco Guerra (RCF Roma Sud)
2000 m steeplechase: Carmelo Cannizzaro (Lib. Running Modica)
10,000 m race walking: Davide Finocchietti (Libertas Runners Livorno)
Pole Vault: Ivan De Angelis (Fiamme Gialle Simoni)
Long Jump: Davide Favro (Atl. Canavesana)
Discus Throw: Enrico Saccomano (Atl. Malignani Libertas UD)
Shot Put: Carmelo Musci (Aden Exprivia Molfetta)

Girls (5)
200 m: Dalia Kaddari (US Tespiense Quartu)
400 m hs: Emma Silvestri (Collection Atl. Sambenedettese)
5000m race walking: Simona Bertini (Asd Francesco Francia)
High Jump: Idea Pieroni (Virtus CR Lucca)
 Discus Throw: Diletta Fortuna (Atl. Vicentina)

Badminton

Italy qualified one player based on the Badminton Junior World Rankings.

Singles

Team

Basketball

Italy qualified a boys' team based on the U18 3x3 National Federation Ranking.

 Boys' tournament - 1 team of 4 athletes, Chinellato Riccardo, Donadio Lorenzo, Filoni Niccolò, Ianuale Nicolò;
But Italy took only 3 athletes to Buenos Aires.
Italy were the only team to compete with only 3 players in the tournament. In spite of that they reached up to the quarter final, where they lost to Ukraine in a thrilling contest.

Skills Competition

Beach handball

Athletes
 Alex Freund
 Max Prantner
 Giovanni Pavani
 Christian Mitterrutzner
 Davide Campestrini
 Davide Notarangelo
 Giovanni Cabrini
 Matteo Capuzzo
 Umberto Bronzo

Beach volleyball

Italy qualified a girls' team based on their performance at 2017-18 European Youth Continental Cup Final.

 Girls' tournament - 1 team of 2 athletes, Bertozzi Nicol, Scampoli Claudia

Boxing

Italy qualified one boxer based on its performance at the 2017 Youth Women's World Boxing Championships.

Boys

Girls

Canoeing

Italy qualified one boat based on its performance at the 2018 World Qualification Event.

 Girls' K1 - Zironi Lucrezia

Cycling

Italy qualified a boys' and girls' combined team based on its ranking in the Youth Olympic Games Junior Nation Rankings.

 Boys' combined team - 1 team of 2 athletes
 Girls' combined team - 1 team of 2 athletes

Dancesport

Italy qualified two dancers based on its performance at the 2018 World Youth Breaking Championship.

 B-Boys - Mattia Schinco aka Bad Matty
 B-Girls - Lexy

Diving

Equestrian

Italy qualified a rider based on its performance at the FEI European Junior Jumping Championships.

 Individual Jumping - Giacomo Casadei 1 athlete

Fencing

Italy qualified five athletes based on its performance at the 2018 Cadet World Championship but only three will compete.

 Boys' Épée - Davide Di Veroli (Italian flagbearer)
 Boys' Foil - Filippo Macchi
 Girls' Épée - Sara Kowalczyk (*)
 Girls' Foil - Martina Favaretto
 Girls' Sabre - Benedetta Taricco (*)

Golf

Individual

Team

Gymnastics

Artistic
Italy qualified two gymnasts based on its performance at the 2018 European Junior Championship.

 Boys' artistic individual all-around - 1 quota
 Girls' artistic individual all-around - 1 quota

Girls
Individual finals

Rhythmic
Italy qualified one rhythmic gymnast based on its performance at the European qualification event.

 Girls' rhythmic individual all-around - 1 quota

Judo

Individual

Team

Karate

Italy qualified one athlete based on the rankings in the Buenos Aires 2018 Olympic Standings.

 Boys' -68 kg - Rosario Ruggiero

Modern pentathlon

Italy qualified two pentathletes based on its performance at the European Youth Olympic Games Qualifier. Italy qualified a second female based on its performance at the 2018 Youth A World Championship. The nation must choose between the two girls.

 Boys' Individual - Giorgio Malan
 Girls' Individual - Beatrice Mercuri or Alice Rinaudo

Roller speed skating

Italy qualified two roller skaters based on its performance at the 2018 Roller Speed Skating World Championship.

 Boys' combined speed event - Vincenzo Maiorca
 Girls' combined speed event - Giorgia Valanzano

Rowing

Italy qualified one boat based on its performance at the 2017 World Junior Rowing Championships. Later, Italy qualified a boys' pair boat based on its performance at the 2018 European Rowing Junior Championships.

 Boys' pair - 1 boat Castelnovo Nicolas, Zamariola Alberto
 Girls' pair – 1 boat Alajdi El Idrissi Khadija, Tonoli Vittoria

Sailing

Italy qualified two boats based on its performance at the 2017 World Techno 293+ Championships. Italy qualified an additional boat based on its performance at the 2018 IKA Twin Tip Racing Youth World Championship. A Nacra 15 boat was qualified based on their performance at the 2018 Nacra 15 World Championships.

 Boys' Techno 293+ - 1 boat
 Girls' Techno 293+ - 1 boat
 Girls' IKA Twin Tip Racing - 1 boat
 Mixed Nacra 15 - 1 boat

Shooting

Italy qualified one sport shooter based on its performance at the 2017 European Championships. Italy later qualified a rifle sport shooter based on its performance at the 2018 European Championships.

 Girls' 10m Air Rifle - 1 quota
 Girls' 10m Air Pistol - 1 quota

Individual

Team

Sport climbing

Italy qualified three sport climbers based on its performance at the 2017 World Youth Sport Climbing Championships. They also qualified a second female climber based on its performance at the 2017 European Youth Sport Climbing Championships.

 Boys' combined - 2 quotas (Filip Schenk, Pietro Biagini)
 Girls' combined - 2 quotas (Laura Rogora, Giorgia Tesio)

Swimming

Table tennis

Italy qualified two table tennis players based on its performance at the Road to Buenos Aires (Latin America) series.

 Boys' singles - Matteo Mutti
 Girls' singles - Jamila Laurenti

Taekwondo

Tennis

Singles

Doubles

Triathlon

Italy qualified two athletes based on its performance at the 2018 European Youth Olympic Games Qualifier.

Individual

Relay

Weightlifting

Italy qualified two athletes based on its performance at the 2017 World Youth Championships.

Boy

Girl

References

2018 in Italian sport
Nations at the 2018 Summer Youth Olympics
Italy at the Youth Olympics